The 2021 Patriot League men's basketball tournament was the conference postseason tournament for the Patriot League. The tournament was held March 3, 6, 10, and 14, 2021 at campus sites of the higher seeds. The winner received the conference's automatic bid to the NCAA tournament.

Seeds
All ten teams in the conference standings qualified for the tournament. The teams were seeded by record in conference, with a tiebreaker system to seed teams with identical conference records. 

The two tiebreakers used by the Patriot League are: 1) head-to-head record of teams with identical record and 2) NCAA NET Rankings available on day following the conclusion of Patriot League regular season play.

Schedule

Bracket

Game summaries

First round

Quarterfinals

Semifinals

Championship

References

Tournament
Patriot League men's basketball tournament
Patriot League men's basketball tournament